Nemzeti Sport (the title means "National Sport") is a Hungarian sports daily.

History and profile
Nemzeti Sport was founded in 1903. The paper is owned by Ringier of Switzerland. It is frequently cited by quality English-language media The paper is published in broadsheet format.

Its publisher claimed that the newspaper had the third largest circulation in the country. The circulation of the paper was 96,000 copies in 2003. It had a circulation of 95,111 copies in 2009, making it the fourth most read daily in the country. The circulation decreased to 18,212 by 2022.

Genre
Although Nemzeti Sport is considered one of the most reliable source of information on sport, recently the online version of the paper became increasingly sensational. An example of this tendency can be observed by the news items about the possible transfer of the Hungary national football team and Dinamo Moscow left-winger Balázs Dzsudzsák.

References

External links
 Official website 

Publications established in 1903
Daily newspapers published in Hungary
Sports mass media in Hungary
Sports newspapers
Hungarian-language newspapers
1903 establishments in Hungary